The Franklin Township School District is a community public school district that serves students in pre-kindergarten through sixth grade from Franklin Township, in Warren County, New Jersey, United States.

As of the 2018–19 school year, the district, comprised of one school, had an enrollment of 201 students and 26.4 classroom teachers (on an FTE basis), for a student–teacher ratio of 7.6:1.

The district is classified by the New Jersey Department of Education as being in District Factor Group "DE", the fifth-highest of eight groupings. District Factor Groups organize districts statewide to allow comparison by common socioeconomic characteristics of the local districts. From lowest socioeconomic status to highest, the categories are A, B, CD, DE, FG, GH, I and J.

Public school students in seventh through twelfth grades attend the schools of the Warren Hills Regional School District, which also serves students from the municipalities of Mansfield Township, Washington Borough, Washington Township and Oxford Township (for 9-12 only, attending on a tuition basis). Schools in the district (with 2018–19 enrollment data from the National Center for Education Statistics) are 
Warren Hills Regional Middle School with 542 students in grades 7 and 8 (located in Washington Borough) and 
Warren Hills Regional High School with 1,205 students in grades 9 - 12 (located in Washington Township).</ref>

School
The Franklin Township School had an enrollment of 201 students in grades PreK-6 as of the 2018–19 school year.
Matt Eagleburger, Principal

Administration
Core members of the district's administration include:
Matt Eagleburger, Superintendent
Timothy Duryea, Business Administrator / Board Secretary

Board of education
The district's board of education, comprised of nine members, sets policy and oversees the fiscal and educational operation of the district through its administration. As a Type II school district, the board's trustees are elected directly by voters to serve three-year terms of office on a staggered basis, with three seats up for election each year held (since 2012) as part of the November general election. The board appoints a superintendent to oversee the district's day-to-day operations and a business administrator to supervise the business functions of the district.

References

External links
Franklin Township School District

School Data for the Franklin Township School District, National Center for Education Statistics
Warren Hills Regional School District

Franklin Township, Warren County, New Jersey
New Jersey District Factor Group DE
School districts in Warren County, New Jersey
Public elementary schools in New Jersey